Man of the East is a 1972 Italian Spaghetti Western film directed by Enzo Barboni starring Terence Hill.

The film is set in the Wild West during the time of the railway construction. A recurring theme is the always progressing modernisation which some of the protagonists are trying to escape.

Plot 
The young English nobleman Sir Thomas Fitzpatrick Phillip Moore (Terence Hill) arrives in the West following the wish of his late father who years earlier had to leave England due to an affair. The trouble led to a conflict with "Vicci Windsor". In the West, the young man joins up with his father's former pals, the stagecoach robbers Monkey (Dominic Barto), Holy Joe (Harry Carey Jr.) and Bull (Gregory Walcott).

The characters are introduced as time moves on during Tom's journey, beginning with Bull who works at a stagecoach station disguised as a mute man. After Bull has listened in on the conversation of two headhunters and found out about the death of "The Englishman" (Tom's father), he begins a journey of his own. In a small town he finds a preacher in his church, conducting a fiery sermon to a somewhat dubious audience of drunkards, gamblers and easy women who he had to drive into his church just as he had to have the saloon's pianola moved into the church right before. Both of them then proceed to Yuma, where the third one, Monkey is in jail as usual. Through deceit they manage to free Monkey after they manage to keep him from taking revenge on the sadistic warden, because according to Holy on the day of the Lord you don't shoot people. From there they travel to the Englishman's gang's old hideout in the mountain, which is also the destination of Tom's journey, who had just before been in a stagecoach robbery performed by the masked trio of Monkey, Bull and Holy.

Tom was just about to inspect the property around the log cabin when suddenly his walking stick is shot out from under him by the three crooks, who do not know who Tom is and therefore suspect him to have come back to retrieve the stolen money.

Soon the situation is explained by Tom showing them a photograph of his father along with giving Holy a letter of his father for the three of them.

In his letter the father asks them to make a "real man" out of his progress-loving son. Initially they fail miserably since Tom refuses to touch a weapon and would rather ride his bicycle than a horse. This changes once he meets Candida (Yanti Somer) in the town's thrift store, the landowner's daughter who he had once met before when she travelled in the same train as him and had captivated his thoughts. There she asks for Books of Lord Byron, which he can procure, unlike the trader. Candida returns his love.

Since Morton (Riccardo Pizzuti), Candida's father's rough ranch administrator has also set his eyes on the girl this leads to several brawls during which Tom initially ends up on the receiving side. Only after an intensive course in all things brawling, shooting and spitting which his father's accomplices put him through Tom not only manages to put Morton in his place but also Candida's father (Enzo Fiermonte) who has been convinced of Tom's skills. It ends with a happy end although Monkey, Bull and Holy leave the town in which progress has taken a footing, driving them to flee further toward the west. In the last scene they reach the Pacific, shocked to hear the whistle of a steam train and so they turned back.

Cast
 Terence Hill as Sir Thomas Fitzpatrick Phillip Moore 
 Gregory Walcott as Bull Smith 
 Yanti Somer as Candida Olsen 
 Dominic Barto as Monkey Smith 
 Harry Carey Jr. as Holy Joe (as Harry Carey) 
 Enzo Fiermonte as Frank Olsen 
 Danika La Loggia as Iris 
 Riccardo Pizzuti as Morton Clayton 
 Jean Louis as Prison Warden 
 Alessandro Sperli as Tim 
 Salvatore Borghese as Cacciatore di taglie (as Salvatore Borgese) 
 Steffen Zacharias as Stalliere 
 Luigi Casellato as Padrone del ristoro 
 Pupo De Luca as Direttore del carcere 
 Antonio Monselesan as Cacciatore di taglie (as Tony Norton)
 Rigal Suzanne Leone
 Kevin Richmond
 Zach Bell

Production 
The film contains several running gags, like the three friends constantly being chased by two bounty hunters. During each encounter one of the three appears behind them, when they are just about to get to business with the others.

Bull every time slams their heads through a then destroyed table, making them appear more bandaged with each new additional encounter.

Another running gag is the calendar problem. Since for the Western heroes every day is a Saturday, Tom has his fair share of problems coordinating meetings with them.

Additionally, there is Bull's Yorkshire Terrier which he stole from a lady during the stagecoach robbery earlier and which he carries around with him. Every time he hands the dog to another person that person has to clean their hands afterwards since the dog appears to not be in control of his bladder.

The story is fairly similar to the comic "The Tenderfoot" from the series Lucky Luke. It is not clear if there is any correlation between the film and the comic. However, in the early 1990s Terence Hill directed and played a TV adaptation of Lucky Luke.

External links 
 
 
 

1970s Western (genre) comedy films
1972 Western (genre) films
Jadran Film films
Spaghetti Western films
United Artists films
Yugoslav Western (genre) films
Films scored by Guido & Maurizio De Angelis
Films produced by Alberto Grimaldi
1972 comedy films
1972 films
1970s Italian films
Yugoslav comedy films
Italian Western (genre) comedy films